Claudio Fabián Arturi Vini (born June 11, 1971) is a former Uruguayan footballer who has played for clubs in Chile, China, Uruguay and Colombia.

Titles
  Deportes Iquique 1997 (Torneo Clausura Chilean Primera B Championship)

References
 Profile at BDFA 

1971 births
Living people
Uruguayan footballers
Uruguayan expatriate footballers
Independiente Medellín footballers
C.D. Antofagasta footballers
Deportes Iquique footballers
C.D. Huachipato footballers
Rampla Juniors players
Once Caldas footballers
Categoría Primera A players
Primera B de Chile players
Chilean Primera División players
Expatriate footballers in Chile
Expatriate footballers in China
Expatriate footballers in Uruguay
Expatriate footballers in Colombia
Association football forwards